Acacia imbricata, commonly known as imbricate wattle, is  a shrub species that is endemic to South Australia.

Description
The yellow globular flowerheads arise from the leaf axils in groups of two or singly. 

The shrub has a dense and spreading habit with glabrous branches that appear somewhat willowy. The strongly acutely angled branchlets are ribbed below the phyllodes. Like most species of Acacia it has phyllodes rather than true leaves. The straight and dark green phyllodes are erect and crowded and have a narrowly oblong or linear to oblanceolate shape with an obscure midrib and no lateral nerves.

Taxonomy
The species was first formally described in 1858 by Victorian Government Botanist Ferdinand von Mueller in Fragmenta Phytographiae Australiae. His description was based on plant material collected from Tumby Bay.

Distribution
The species has a limited distribution and is located in the south east of the Eyre Peninsula from around the Yeelanna–Ungarra road in the north down to around Koppio and Warunda in the south where it is usually a part of open woodland or forest or scrubland communities growing in sandy soils.

See also
List of Acacia species

References

imbricata
Flora of South Australia
Fabales of Australia
Taxa named by Ferdinand von Mueller